Parliamentary elections were held in Sudan between 1 and 12 April 1986.They were the first multi-party elections in the country since 1968, and saw a victory for the Umma Party, which emerged as the single largest party with 100 of the 260 filled seats in the National Assembly. No party emerged with a majority; the Umma Party formed a coalition government.

The election took place amidst the Second Sudanese Civil War, and voting was postponed indefinitely in 41 seats in Southern Sudan due to security concerns. Voter turnout was 67.5%. The election was among the freest and fairest elections in Africa up to that time. 

To date, these are the last free elections held in Sudan.

Results

By constituency

Graduate constituencies

Khartoum

Bahr el Ghazal

Equatoria

Upper Nile

References

Elections in Sudan
1986 in Sudan
Sudan
National Legislature (Sudan)
Election and referendum articles with incomplete results